Falzone is an Italian surname. Notable people with the surname include:

Diana Falzone, American reporter
Joseph Falzone (1900–1984), American lawyer and politician
Lisa Falzone, American businesswoman
Mark Falzone (born 1975), American politician

Italian-language surnames